Forest Alert is a Canadian documentary film directed by Richard Desjardins and Robert Monderie, released in 1999. The film is a portrait of the forestry industry in Quebec, centred on its reliance on the environmentally unfriendly practice of clearcutting.

The film's original French title, which literally means "Northern Error" and refers to the boreal forest, is also a pun on l'aurore boréale, the French name for the aurora borealis.

The film won the Jutra Award for Best Documentary Film at the 1st Jutra Awards.

References

External links

1999 films
1999 documentary films
Canadian documentary films
Quebec films
National Film Board of Canada documentaries
Documentary films about forests and trees
1990s French-language films
French-language Canadian films
1990s Canadian films
Best Documentary Film Jutra and Iris Award winners